The Saint and the Templar Treasure is the title of a 1979 mystery novel featuring the character of Simon Templar, alias "The Saint". The novel is written by Graham Weaver and Donne Avenell, but per the custom at this time, the author credit on the cover goes to Leslie Charteris, who created the Saint in 1928, and who served in an editorial capacity.

The book was first published in the United States by The Crime Club, and was followed thereafter by a United Kingdom edition from Hodder and Stoughton. The US edition adjusts the cover credit to read Leslie Charteris' The Saint and the Templar Treasure.

Following publication of this book, Charteris submitted for publication a novel entitled The Saint's Lady written by a Saint fan named Joy Martin. This novel was not published, so the next book to appear was Count on the Saint.

Plot summary

1979 British novels
Simon Templar books
The Crime Club books